Antonio Musa Brassavola (variously spelled Brasavoli, Brasavola, or Brasavoli; 16 January 1500 – 1555) was an Italian physician and one of the most famous of his time. He studied under Niccolò Leoniceno and Giovanni Manardo. He was the friend and physician of Ercole II, the duke of Este. He was also the consulting physician of Kings Francis I, Charles V, Henry VIII and Popes Paul III, Leo X, Clement VIII and Julius III. He performed the first successful tracheotomy, and published an account of it in 1546. He was the chair of philosophy in Ferrara and also studied botany and medicine. A genus of orchid, called Brassavola, is named after him.

Writings (selection) 
 Examen omnium simplicium medicamentorum, quorum in officinis usus est. Jean & François Frellon, Lyon, 1537
 Examen omnium syruporum, 1540 Digital edition by the University and State Library Düsseldorf   
 In octo libros aphorismorum Hippocratis & Galeni commentaria & annotationes, 1541
 In libros de ratione victus in morbis acutis Hippocratis & Galeni commentaria & annotationes, 1546
 Examen omnium electuariorum. Venice, ex Officina Erasmiana Vincentii Valgrisii, 1548 Digital edition by the University and State Library Düsseldorf
 Index refertissimus in omnes Galeni libros, 1556

His writings consist of works in the fields of medicine and botany. He also wrote extensively about the physician Galen.

References

External links
History of the tracheotomy which has a picture of Brassavola

16th-century Italian physicians
16th-century Italian botanists
1500 births
1555 deaths
Year of death unknown